Cypionic acid, also known as cyclopentylpropionic acid, is an aliphatic carboxylic acid with the molecular formula C8H14O2. Its salts and esters are known as cypionates or cipionates.

The primary use of cypionic acid is in pharmaceutical formulations.  Cypionic acid is used to prepare ester prodrugs which have increased half-lives relative to the parent compound.  The lipophilicity of the cypionate group allows the prodrug to be sequestered in fat depots after intramuscular injection. The ester group is slowly hydrolyzed by metabolic enzymes, releasing steady doses of the active ingredient.  Examples include testosterone cypionate, estradiol cypionate, hydrocortisone cypionate, oxabolone cipionate, and mesterolone cypionate.

References

Carboxylic acids
Cyclopentyl compounds